Thomas Austin Yawkey, born Thomas Yawkey Austin (February 21, 1903 – July 9, 1976), was an American industrialist, philanthropist, conservationist and Major League Baseball executive. Born in Detroit, Yawkey became president of the Boston Red Sox in 1933 and was the sole owner of the team for 44 seasons until he died of leukemia. He was elected to the Baseball Hall of Fame in 1980.

Early life

Yawkey was born in Detroit on February 21, 1903, to insurance executive Thomas J. Austin and his wife Augusta. Augusta was the eldest child of William Clyman Yawkey, who had become wealthy in the lumber and iron ore industries of the Midwestern United States. In addition to these interests, William Clyman Yawkey had agreed to buy the Detroit Tigers baseball team in 1903, but died before the deal closed. His son, William H. "Bill" Yawkey, completed the purchase with Frank Navin in late 1903.

When Yawkey was about six months old, his father died. After his father's death, Yawkey and his mother moved to New York City to live with his uncle, William Yawkey. Throughout his life, Yawkey maintained a residence in New York City. In September 1918, William adopted 15-year-old Tom after his mother died. His last name was changed to Yawkey after the adoption.

Bill Yawkey died in 1919 and left half of his $40 million (roughly $644 million in 2022) estate to Tom. A clause in the will created two trusts that he gained access to at 25 and 30 years old. Yawkey graduated from the Irving School in Tarrytown, NY in 1920 and from the Sheffield Scientific School at Yale University in 1925. While at Yale, Yawkey was a member of the Phi Gamma Delta fraternity.

Boston Red Sox
Having met as alumni of the Irving School, Yawkey and Eddie Collins, a former Philadelphia Athletics second baseman, discussed purchasing a baseball team in 1933, when Yawkey was due to turn 30 and gain full access to his fortune. Collins found a potential target in the Boston Red Sox, who had spent the better part of a decade and a half as one of the worst teams in baseball. Former owner Harry Frazee had been forced to sell most of his best players to the New York Yankees due to chronic cash shorts. His successor, Bob Quinn, had been grossly underfinanced since the illness and death of a major investor. By the 1932-33 offseason, Quinn was so strapped that he had to borrow against his life insurance to send the team to spring training.

Collins arranged a meeting between Quinn and Yawkey during the 1932 World Series; he later agreed to come to the Red Sox if Yawkey purchased the team. On February 25, 1933, Yawkey bought the Red Sox for $1.25 million. The deal closed just five days after Yawkey turned 30. He became team president, giving Collins control of day-to-day operations as vice president and general manager (posts Collins held until 1947).

However, at one stroke the Red Sox had gone from having one of the poorest owners in baseball to easily the richest. Determined to get the Red Sox out of the basement right away, Yawkey and Collins attempted to build a successful team by acquiring talented players. He also spent $1.5 million on repairs to Fenway Park, giving it much of its present look.

Yawkey didn't take long to turn the Red Sox around. In 1934, they reached .500 for the first time since winning the 1918 World Series. In 1937, they notched their first winning record since 1918, and in 1938 finished in the first division for the first time since 1918. When it became apparent that buying top level major league players wasn't enough to vault them past the Yankees and Detroit Tigers, Yawkey began building a minor-league system as well.

Under Yawkey, the Jimmy Fund became the official charity of the team in 1953. In 1957, Yawkey was elected chairman of the Jimmy Fund's board of trustees and helped establish the tradition of the Red Sox playing exhibition games to raise money for the fund.

Yawkey spent millions over the course of his life attempting to build winning teams. In the first seven years of his ownership alone, he lost $1.7 million, more than he paid to buy the team. According to financial records of the time, he spent at least another $3 million during that time on buying players, renovating Fenway Park, and other capital expenses. The Boston Globe wrote in his obituary that, in 1974, Yawkey estimated his ownership of the team had cost him over $10 million. The Red Sox won the American League pennant in 1946 (their first pennant since 1918), 1967, and 1975, but then went on to lose each World Series in seven games, against the St. Louis Cardinals (1946, 1967) and the Cincinnati Reds (1975). Yawkey never achieved his goal of winning a world championship.

According to two anonymous sources in an article by Jeff Passan in 2011, Yawkey kept Donald Fitzpatrick, an equipment manager for the Red Sox, employed despite allegations of sexual assault against Fitzpatrick. However, no public allegations against Fitzpatrick were made until 1991, 15 years after Yawkey's death.

Integration of the Red Sox
The Red Sox were the first MLB team to sign a Mexican-born player, fielding Mel Almada on September 8, 1933. However, they were the last major league team to add a black player to their roster allegedly due to Yawkey and the managers he hired being racists. These claims have been disputed by some journalists and researchers. In his biography of Yawkey, Bill Nowlin states that there is no evidence that Yawkey ever made a racist statement or was "personally racist." Furthermore, a 2006 article in The Boston Globe commented that Yawkey "was not overtly racist, but members of his inner circle were."

According to the Boston Herald, as owner of the Boston Red Sox, the team's integration policy was Yawkey's responsibility. In 1945, the Red Sox held a tryout for Jackie Robinson, Sam Jethroe, and Marvin Williams, but the men never heard back from the team after the tryout and Robinson was signed by the Brooklyn Dodgers for the 1947 season. In 1967, Robinson said Yawkey was "probably one of the most bigoted guys in baseball".

The team's attempts to integrate prior to 1959 were unsuccessful. In the 1940s and 50s, Joe Cronin, general manager after Eddie Collins, scouted black players, including Sam Jethroe, Larry Doby and Bill Greason but none signed with the team. In 1950, the team signed Lorenzo Piper Davis, their first black player, for their minor league team, but he was released in May of that year. Three years later, the team signed Earl Wilson to their minor league team, but his career was interrupted by serving in the Marines in 1957. Wilson returned to the Sox's Minneapolis farm team after completing his military service and was fielded by the Sox in July 1959.

In 1956, The Boston Globe published an article discussing the Red Sox's lack of black players on the team, where manager Joe Cronin denied prejudice allegations. The article reported that the Red Sox had made an offer of $115,000 for Charlie Neal in 1954, but the offer was rejected.

Despite the Red Sox having multiple black players in their farm system during the 1950s, the team did not promote any of them to the major league until 1959. In 1959, Pumpsie Green, who was signed by the team in 1955, made his debut on July 21.

In 1967, the Red Sox fielded a team with a starting lineup including multiple black players, such as George Scott and Reggie Smith.

Death and legacy

Yawkey died from leukemia in Boston on July 9, 1976. His wife, Jean R. Yawkey, became president of the club following his death. Yawkey was posthumously inducted into the Baseball Hall of Fame in 1980.

The Yawkey Foundation 
The Yawkey Foundation was established in 1976 through a bequest in his will. Yawkey set aside $10 million in his will, which was probated in New York, to establish the foundation. In 1982, Jean Yawkey created a second Yawkey Foundation.

In 2002, the original Foundation donated $25 million to Massachusetts General Hospital to build an outpatient center, and recorded $420 million in 2002 income after the sale of the Red Sox.

In 2003, the Foundation donated $15 million to Boston Medical Center, a safety net hospital, to build the Moakley Cancer Care Building.

In 2005, the Foundation created the Yawkey Scholars Program to award college scholarships to students with demonstrated financial need.

In 2007, the Yawkey Foundations donated $30 million for the Dana–Farber Cancer Institute to build the Yawkey Center for Cancer Care in Boston.

In 2008, the original Foundation supported the building of a new home, Jean Yawkey Place, for the Boston Health Care for the Homeless program.

In 2013, the Foundation awarded $10 million to the Museum of Science for a gallery and $3 million to Cape Cod Healthcare for an emergency center.

In 2014, The Foundation gave a $10 million donation to Boston University to support a paid internship program for students to work at nonprofits.

In 2018, the Foundation donated $10 million to Tidelands Georgetown Memorial Hospital to expand the facility. Yawkey donated $100,000 to build the original hospital in 1945.

In June 2021, the Foundation donated $5 million to Franciscan Children's new mental health center.

Yawkey Way 
In 1977, the section of Jersey Street where Fenway Park is located was renamed Yawkey Way in his honor. However, in August 2017, due to Yawkey's alleged history of racism, the Red Sox principal owner John W. Henry announced the team was seeking to change the name of the street. The following year, Henry publicly distanced the team from Yawkey, citing that he was "haunted by what went on here a long time before we arrived," referring to the team being the last in the major leagues to integrate under Tom Yawkey's guidance. 

The change was approved by the Boston Public Improvement Commission in April 2018, and the name reverted to Jersey Street in May 2018. Also in May, a plaque commemorating Yawkey from "his Red Sox employees," that had hung at the administrative office entrance to Fenway Park since shortly after his death was removed. In April 2019, the MBTA Commuter Rail station near the park, Yawkey station, was renamed Lansdowne station.

Tom Yawkey Wildlife Center Heritage Preserve 
Through his will, Yawkey donated three coastal islands in Georgetown, South Carolina, to the state to create a wildlife preserve. It is managed by the South Carolina Department of Natural Resources.

In 1919, when Yawkey was 16, he inherited part of the land from his Uncle William, who originally purchased the land as part of the South Island Gun Club. Prior to the gun club owning the land, it was the site of multiple plantations.

Personal life
Yawkey married Elise Sparrow in 1925, and the couple adopted a daughter named Julia in July 1936. The couple divorced in November 1944. Yawkey married Jean R. Hiller on Christmas Eve 1944. Tom and Jean Yawkey had no children. Yawkey's only sibling, his sister Emma, died in December 1963.

In 2018, a biography of Yawkey entitled Tom Yawkey: Patriarch of the Boston Red Sox by Bill Nowlin was published by the University of Nebraska Press.

See also
 Boston Red Sox Hall of Fame
The Victory Season, a book about the 1946 baseball season

References

Further reading 
 
Armour, Mark. "Tom Yawkey". SABR. Retrieved May 3, 2021.

External links

Yawkey Foundation

1903 births
1976 deaths
20th-century American businesspeople
Boston Red Sox executives
Boston Red Sox owners
Businesspeople from Detroit
Businesspeople from Massachusetts
Deaths from cancer in Massachusetts
Deaths from leukemia
Major League Baseball executives
Major League Baseball owners
Major League Baseball team presidents
National Baseball Hall of Fame inductees
Yale School of Engineering & Applied Science alumni